Trachyphloeus alternans is a species of snout or bark beetle in the family Curculionidae.

References

Further reading

 
 
 
 
 
 

Curculionidae
Beetles described in 1834